Anne Stella Fomumbod is a Cameroonian women's rights activist. She is the founder and CEO of the Interfaith Vision Foundation of Cameroon (IVFCam), and the driving force behind the Metta Charter on Widowhood, which has enabled significant progress in the human right of widows in her country.

Career
In 1999, Fomumbod founded the Interfaith Vision Foundation of Cameroon (IVFCam). The organisation was originally called Aid International Christian Women of Vision (AI-ChrisWOV), but the name was changed in January 2008 following a consultation and assessment sponsored by Voluntary Service Overseas, which highlighted the clear need to embrace all faiths.

IVFCam focuses its efforts on helping the disadvantaged, particularly women and children, especially young widows, orphans and those with HIV and AIDS. IVF Cam is a not-for-profit, non-governmental charity, and has worked with the Economic and Social Council of the United Nations since 2013.

Fomumbod has "worked with 53 village councils to promote women’s rights and the inclusion of more women on local councils". She is perhaps best known for creating and obtaining government support for the Metta Charter on Widowhood, a first in Cameroon, allowing significant progress in the human right of widows.

Fomumbod received the government of Cameroonian government's Award of Excellence from Governor Lafrique.

Honours and awards
In 2004, Fomumbod received a National Award for the Advancement of Women. In 2010, she received the Women's World Summit Foundation's Prize for Women's Creativity in Rural Life.

In 2013, Fomumbod was included in the BBC's 100 Women.

References

Living people
Cameroonian women
Cameroonian women's rights activists
Year of birth missing (living people)
BBC 100 Women